Lucretia is an oil on canvas painting by the Italian Rococo artist Andrea Casali, completed around 1750.

External links
1st-art-gallery
Italian paintings
1750 paintings
Casali